TCL Electronics Holdings Limited is a Chinese company headquartered and listed in Hong Kong, but incorporated in the Grand Cayman, the Cayman Islands. It manufactures televisions and other consumer electronics. It is a subsidiary of TCL Industries Holdings, a company which itself is a subsidiary of TCL Technology.

History
TCL Electronics was the consumer electronic arm of TCL Corporation. It had a joint venture in Argentina, which TCL Multimedia changed to a subscription agreement in 2017. A proposed name change of the company was also announced in the same year. The name was changed from TCL Multimedia to TCL Electronics.

Main business distribution
TCL has set up production and marketing systems in dozens of countries and regions worldwide. It manages seven global R&D centers, 17 manufacturing bases, and 40,000 sales outlets. The company has four supply chains: product design and manufacturing, logistics and supply, quality assurance, and product creation and support.

References

External links
 
Official Twitter

Civilian-run enterprises of China
Companies listed on the Hong Kong Stock Exchange
Electronics companies of China
Manufacturing companies based in Shenzhen
Offshore companies of the Cayman Islands
Tsuen Wan